Uintatheriidae is a family of extinct ungulate mammals that includes Uintatherium.  Uintatheres belong to the order Dinocerata, one of several extinct orders of primitive hoofed mammals that are sometimes united in the Condylarthra.

Uintatheres were the largest land animals of their time, surviving from the late Paleocene into the Uintan Epoch of the Middle Eocene. They were heavy animals, with thick legs, massive bones, broad feet, and tiny brains. The most distinctive feature of the great majority of species, however, was the presence of multiple blunt "horns", perhaps similar to the ossicones of modern giraffes, and the presence of large, sabre-like canine teeth. They were eventually replaced as large browsing animals by the even larger brontotheres.

Genera
Family Uintatheriidae
 Subfamily Uintatheriinae
 Genus Bathyopsis
 Genus Eobasileus
 Genus Prodinoceras
 Genus Tetheopsis
 Genus Uintatherium
 Subfamily Gobiatheriinae
 Genus Gobiatherium

Because the skulls of the species of Gobiatherium lack the diagnostic ossicones and fang-tusks of other uintatheres, the genus is sometimes placed within its own family, "Gobiatheriidae."

References

Dinoceratans
Paleocene mammals
Eocene mammals
Eocene extinctions
Paleocene first appearances
Prehistoric mammal families